Kim Myung-jin(Korean:김명진) (born  in Seoul) is a South Korean wheelchair curler.

He participated at the 2010 and 2014 Winter Paralympics. He is a  silver medallist.

Wheelchair curling teams and events

References

External links 

Profile at the Official Website for the 2010 Winter Paralympics in Vancouver
Profile at the 2014 Winter Paralympics site

Living people
1971 births
Curlers from Seoul
South Korean male curlers
South Korean wheelchair curlers
Paralympic wheelchair curlers of South Korea
Wheelchair curlers at the 2010 Winter Paralympics
Wheelchair curlers at the 2014 Winter Paralympics
Medalists at the 2010 Winter Paralympics
Paralympic silver medalists for South Korea
Paralympic medalists in wheelchair curling
21st-century South Korean people